= Gatesian =

Gatesian is an eponymous adjective and may refer to:

- Bill Gates (born 1955), American businessman and co-founder of Microsoft Corporation
- Henry Louis Gates Jr. (born 1950), American critic and scholar
